Clarks Pond is a small lake located south-southeast of the hamlet of Masonville in Delaware County, New York. Clarks Pond drains south via Cold Spring Creek which flows into the West Branch Delaware River.

See also
 List of lakes in New York

References 

Lakes of New York (state)
Lakes of Delaware County, New York